2002 is the first studio album by South Korean rapper Gary. The album was released on September 21, 2015, by Leessang Company and Loen Entertainment.

Track listing

References

2015 albums
Gary (rapper) albums